Moyencharia sommerlattei is a moth of the family Cossidae. It is found in Guinea. The habitat consists of various forest types at low elevations.

The wingspan is about 24 mm. The forewings are warm buff along the costa. The hindwings are glossy warm buff with ivory yellow.

Etymology
The species is named for Dr Herbert Sommerlatte.

References

Moths described in 2013
Moyencharia
Insects of West Africa
Moths of Africa